The term 1948 Arab–Israeli War refers to either:
 The 1948 Arab–Israeli War, the second half of the 1948 Palestine war
 The 1948 Palestine war